Élise Turcotte (born 26 June 1957 in Sorel, Quebec) is a Canadian writer. She completed her BA and MA in literary studies at the University of Quebec and later received her doctorate at the Université de Sherbrooke. She now teaches literature at a CEGEP in Montreal, where she currently resides. Her writing has won much praise, and among other things she has won the Grand Prix de Poésie, as well as the 2003 Governor General's Award for her novel La Maison étrangère and the Prix Émile-Nelligan for La voix de Carla in 1987 and for La terre est ici in 1989.

References

External links
Critical bibliography database (Auteurs.contemporain.info) 

1957 births
Living people
20th-century Canadian novelists
20th-century Canadian poets
21st-century Canadian novelists
21st-century Canadian poets
Canadian women poets
Writers from Quebec
Canadian women novelists
Governor General's Award-winning fiction writers
Université de Sherbrooke alumni
Canadian poets in French
20th-century Canadian women writers
21st-century Canadian women writers
Canadian novelists in French